The Uspantán mine  is one of the largest nickel mines in Guatemala. The mine is located in Uspantán in Quiché Department. The mine has reserves amounting to 40 million tonnes of ore grading 1.25% nickel.

References 

Nickel mines in Guatemala
Quiché Department